PIPE Networks (also known as PIPE) is an Australian telecommunications company, based in Brisbane, Queensland. It is a subsidiary of TPG Telecom. Its primary business is setting up peering exchanges.  PIPE itself stands for "Public Internet Peering Exchange". The company also provides services such as co-location, telehousing, and fibre networks.

PIPE listed on the then Australian Stock Exchange on 17 May 2005 as PIPE Networks Limited with a stock code of: PWK.

Australian ISPs which use PIPE's metropolitan fibre networks include Eftel, iiNet, Internode, Netspace and iPrimus amongst others.

In March 2010, shareholders accepted a takeover offer from TPG Telecom Limited. The company was noted for recently increasing their revenues, in contrast to the general trend in their industry.

Peering exchanges
PIPE currently runs six metropolitan exchange networks.

PIPE International
In January 2008, PIPE Networks announced it would be constructing a $200 million international link, known as PPC-1 (Pipe Pacific Cable), from Sydney to Guam. The link connects Madang in Papua New Guinea. It is operated by a newly formed PIPE subsidiary, PIPE International.

In April 2008, PIPE Networks entered into a joint venture with New Zealand-based Kordia to build an undersea fibre optic cable between New Zealand and Australia.  This cable will be known as PPC-2.

Takeover offer

In March 2010, shareholders voted to accept a $373 million takeover offer by TPG Telecom Ltd. for $6.30 per share (TPG Annual Report 2010, p48). The takeover was subject to approval by the Queensland Supreme Court. Shares of TPG rose 11 per cent after the news was released.

See also

 Internet in Australia
 List of Internet exchange points
 Pipe Pacific Cable

References

External links
PIPE Networks
PIPE International
Media presentation for PPC-1
PIPE resources in South Australia/NT

Companies formerly listed on the Australian Securities Exchange
Internet exchange points in Australia
Companies based in Brisbane
Australian companies established in 2001